Souryam is a 2008 Indian Telugu-language action film produced by V. Anand Prasad on Bhavya Creations banner and directed by cinematographer Siva, who made his directorial debut. It stars Gopichand, Anushka Shetty, Poonam Kaur and Manoj K. Jayan  along with Ajay, Ali, Dharmavarapu Subramanyam, Sudha, Tanikella Bharani and M. S. Narayana in the pivotal roles, the music was composed by Mani Sharma. 
The film was released theatrically on 25 September 2008. It was remade in Kannada-language as Shourya, into Dhallywood as Mone Boro Kosto and in Tamil-language by Prabhu Deva as Vedi. The film was later dubbed in Malayalam & Hindi as Shouryam & Meri Shapath and released in 2009.

Plot
Vijay (Gopichand) comes to Kolkata in search of his lost sister. In a series of events, he ends up getting caught in a brawl with some goons and in self-defense chops a man's arm off. Later Vijay approaches a college in Kolkata to apply for a job and he is asked to get a signature in the sports quota. He later meets Gymson (Ali) and finds out he is the strongest teacher in the college. He meets a bubbly college girl Swetha (Anushka Shetty) and soon, they fall in love. One day, the gangster's son named Ajay (Ajay) finds out that Vijay is alive and he swears to avenge his father's insult and arrest.

At a party, Ajay finds and meets Swetha and asks if she wants to sleep with him and cuts her blouse down. Swetha was disrespected and embarrassed, then later, Ajay follows her and Divya (Poonam Kaur), and cornering the girls with his men. After his father sent him a picture of the person he needs to abduct, Ajay found out that Divya is the key and abducted her by force. Divya was able to escape from the goons then she finds a man who comes to rescue her, who was apparently Vijay, and fights them in vain and also kills Ajay. Its aftermath resulted to an injured Divya as she was taken by Vijay to the hospital. At the hospital, Vijay revealed to Swetha that he was looking for Divya, his long lost separated sister who hated him for ignoring her when they were kids. But unbeknownst by Divya, he was forced to ignore her sister because of his dream for her to have a better life than to live in the streets with him. He hides his identity from her and grew up with the influence of a police officer until he is ready to find her in the present day to meet her. But when gangsters chase Swetha and Vijay at the hospital, Vijay was forced to fight and kill some of Ajay's goons in front of Swetha which made her scared of him on the way he fights ruthlessly and grimly. Vijay reveals his past life as a police officer to Swetha. The police officer who raised Vijay was made to die by Sivarama Goud,a gangster.

Vijay then finally decided to end the problem. He finally faced Sivarama Goud (Manoj K. Jayan), Ajay's gangster father and the ruthless mastermind who also terrorized an innocent village. He created a clever plan to make Sivarama and his men to be punished in all of their crimes from the village and to other people making them end behind bars. After narrating, Divya is taken by Vijay to safety. She then pleads Vijay to accept Swetha which he reciprocates.

After a while, Vijay, who decided to check on Divya, finds out that she was abducted again. Vijay is shocked to see Sivarama out of jail again and takes Divya as bait. Divya, still innocent of Vijay's true relation to her, pleads on Vijay not to fight for her anymore because they are not related. But because Sivarama made her realize that his long lost brother will die in front of her, she emotionally forgives him for the past as she briefly watches Vijay being beaten up by Sivarama's goons.

Vijay had the strength to finish the job successfully when he felt his sister finally acknowledging him as her brother.
After a while, it was seen that Vijay and Divya are leaving to start a new life again as siblings and the two invited Swetha to come along with them.

Cast

Gopichand as ACP T. Vijay IPS
Anushka Shetty as Swetha
Poonam Kaur as Divya, Vijay's estranged sister
Manoj K. Jayan as Sivarama Goud (voice dubbed by P. Ravi Shankar)
Ajay as Ajay, Sivarama's son
Ali as Gymson
Dharmavarapu Subramanyam as Swetha's father
Sudha as Swetha's mother
Tanikella Bharani as Karim
M. S. Narayana as Dr. Aarogyam
Sarath Babu as Commissioner Sarath
Vinaya Prasad as Sarath's wife
Pruthviraj as Police Officer
Banerjee as DCP
Subbaraya Sarma as Church Pastor
Krishna Bhagawan as Dr. Krishna Bhagawan MBBS
Raghu Babu as Athidhi Sastry
Aarthi as Aarthi
Pavala Shyamala as Colony Woman
Fish Venkat as Sivarama Goud's henchman
Ramachandra as Student
Ramaraju as Divya's uncle
C. V. L. Narasimha Rao as Principal
Malladi Raghava as Judge
Hema Sundar as Judge
Vijaya Rangaraju as Goon
Rachana Maurya (special appearance in song "Ole Ole")
Anil Ravipudi (cameo as Hospital receptionist)

Soundtrack

Music was composed by Mani Sharma and released on Aditya Music.

Remakes
The film was remade into Kannada-language as Shourya, in Dhallywood as Mone Boro Kosto and in Tamil-language by Prabhu Deva as Vedi.

Reception

Souryam received positive reviews. Idlebrain rated it 3/5, stating that "The film is aimed mainly at the masses and B/C center crowds. The film's commercial success depends on how the crowds embrace the sister sentiment in the film." Sify also rated it 3/5, giving it the verdict of "mass entertainer" Greatandhra similarly rated it 3/5,calling it"Full Length Mass Entertainer" 123telugu rated it 3/5,calling it "another 'Gopichand' brand flick" Fullyhyd rated it 3.25/5,stating "If you are looking for a masala entertainer, and can tolerate the excessive blood and gore, you will enjoy Souryam."

References

External links
 

2008 films
Films shot in Kolkata
Telugu films remade in other languages
2000s masala films
2000s Telugu-language films
Films directed by Siva (director)
Films scored by Mani Sharma
Fictional portrayals of the Andhra Pradesh Police
2008 directorial debut films